The Bach family refers to several notable composers of the baroque and classical periods of music, the best-known of whom was Johann Sebastian Bach (1685–1750). A family genealogy was drawn up by Johann Sebastian Bach himself in 1735 when he was 50 and was completed by his son Carl Philipp Emanuel.

Ancestors of Johann Sebastian Bach

Four branches of the Bach family were known at the beginning of the 16th century; a Hans Bach of Wechmar, a village between Gotha and Arnstadt in Thuringia, is known to have been alive in 1561. He is believed to be the father of Veit Bach.

 Veit (Vitus) Bach (c. 1550–1619, Wechmar) was, according to Johann Sebastian's genealogy, "a white-bread baker in Hungary" who had to flee Hungary because he was a Lutheran, settling in Wechmar. He "found the greatest pleasure in a little cittern which he took with him even into the mill";
 His son Johannes Bach I (c. 1580–1626) "" (lit. "the player"), was the first professional musician of the family. He "at first took up the trade of baker, but having a particular bent for music," he became a piper;
 His second grandson Christoph (c. 1613–1661) was an instrumentalist;
 His first great-grandson Johann Ambrosius was a violinist, and the father of Johann Sebastian Bach.

Others born before 1685
Johann Ambrosius' uncle, Heinrich of Arnstadt, had two sons: Johann Michael and Johann Christoph. The latter was once thought to be the author of the motet  (I will not leave you), which is now confirmed to be Johann Sebastian Bach's (BWV 159a). Another descendant of Veit Bach, Johann Ludwig, was revered more than any other ancestor by Johann Sebastian, who copied twelve of his church cantatas and sometimes added work of his own to them.

Descendants of Johann Sebastian Bach
Of the seven children that Johann Sebastian Bach had with his first wife Maria Barbara Bach, his second cousin, four survived into adulthood: Catharina Dorothea Bach (1708-1774); Wilhelm Friedemann; Carl Philipp Emanuel (the "Berlin Bach", later the "Hamburg Bach"); and Johann Gottfried Bernhard. All four were musically talented, and Wilhelm Friedeman and Carl Philipp Emanuel had significant musical careers of their own.

After his first wife died, Johann Sebastian Bach married Anna Magdalena Wilcken, a gifted soprano and daughter of the court trumpeter of Prince Saxe-Weissenfels. They had 13 children, of whom Johann Christoph Friedrich (the "Bückeburg Bach") and Johann Christian (the "London Bach") became significant musicians. A further four survived into adulthood: Gottfried Heinrich; Elisabeth Juliane Friederica (1726–1781), who married Bach's pupil Johann Christoph Altnickol; Johanna Carolina (1737–1781); and Regina Susanna (1742–1809).

Of Bach's surviving children, only five would marry. Of these, Johann Christian would have no children from his marriage to the soprano Cecilia Grassi. Carl Philipp Emanuel, who married Johanna Maria Dannemann, would have three surviving children. Of these children the youngest, Johann Sebastian (1748–1778) was a gifted painter who died young. None of Emanuel's children would marry or have offspring, with his bloodline dying out with the death of his daughter Anna Carolina Philippina (1746–1804).

Elisabeth Juliane Friederica, known as Liesgen, with Altnickol had three surviving children. Their only son, Johann Sebastian died in infancy in 1740. The elder daughter, Augusta Magdalena (1751–1809) married Ernest Friedrich Ahlefeldt and have four daughters, of whom only one, Christiane Johanne (1780–1816) would survive. From her marriage to Paul Johann Müller, a daughter, Augusta Wilhelmina (1809–1818) was born, though she would die as an infant, ending this line of Bach's descendants.

Of the next generation, Wilhelm Friedrich Ernst Bach, also known as William Bach (24 May 1759 – 25 December 1845) was the eldest son of Johann Christoph Friedrich Bach and the only grandson of Johann Sebastian Bach to gain fame as a composer. He was music director to Frederick William II of Prussia. WFE's only son died in infancy. The first born of his three daughters, Caroline Augusta Wilhelmine, lived the longest. She died in 1871 – the last of Bach's descendants to hold the Bach name.

Bach has living descendants via two granddaughters born to Friedemann and Johann Christoph Friedrich, respectively. Anna Philippine Friederike (1755–1804), sister of Wilhelm Friedrich Ernst, married Wilhelm Ernst Colson, a lieutenant in an artillery regiment. They would have five sons and a daughter. While this bloodline was traditionally assumed to have died out with this generation, one of her sons, Johann Christoph Friedrich (1778–1831) married and had offspring with progeny to the modern day.

Friedemann married Dorothea Elisabeth Georgi and would have two sons and a daughter. Both sons died in infancy. During the 20th-century scholarship has uncovered several children born to his daughter Friederica Sophia (b. 1757), which were hitherto unknown. Friederica Sophia married Johann Schmidt, a footsoldier in 1793 shortly after the birth of an illegitimate daughter. Of this child and a sister little is known. In 1780 she had given birth to an illegitimate son, of which nothing further is known. Friederica Sophia appears to have left her husband for a man by the name of Schwarzschulz, with whom she had an illegitimate daughter, Karoline Beata (b. 1798) whose descendants eventually emigrated to Oklahoma.

Partial family tree

Expanded genealogy

Veit Bach (–1619)
Johannes Bach I (d. 1626) (son of Veit Bach)
Johann(es) Bach III (1604–1673) – the so-called Erfurt Line
Johann Christian Bach I (1640–1682)
Johann Jacob Bach II (1668–1692)
Johann Christoph Bach IV (1673–1727)
Johann Samuel Bach (1694–1720)
Johann Christian Bach II (1696–?)
Johann Günther Bach II (1703–1756)
Johann Aegidius Bach I (1645–1716)
Johann Balthasar Bach (1673–1691)
Johann Bernhard Bach I (1676–1749)
Johann Ernst Bach II (1722–1777)
Johann Georg Bach I (1751–1797)
Johann Christoph Bach VI (1685–1740)
Johann Friedrich Bach II (1706–1743)
Johann Aegidius Bach II (1709–1746)
Johann Nicolaus Bach I (1653–1682)
Christoph Bach (1613–1661)
Georg Christoph Bach (1642–1697)
Johann Valentin Bach (1669–1720)
Johann Lorenz Bach (1695–1773)
Johann Elias Bach (1705–1755)
Johann Michael Bach III (1745–1820) – the music theorist
Johann Georg Bach II (1786–1874)
Georg Friedrich Bach (1792–1860)
Johann Christoph Bach II (1645–1693)
Johann Ernst Bach I (1683–1739)
Johann Christoph Bach VII (1689–1740)
Johann Ambrosius Bach (1645–1695)
Johann Christoph Bach III (1671–1721)
Johann Andreas Bach (1713–1779)
Johann Christoph Georg Bach (1747–1814)
Johann Bernhard Bach II (1700–1743)
Johann Christoph Bach VIII (1702–1756)
Ernst Carl Gottfried Bach (1738–1801)
Ernst Christian Bach (1747–1822)
Philipp Christian Georg Bach (1734–1809)
Johann Jacob Bach III (1682–1722)
Johann Sebastian Bach (1685–1750) – wed in his first marriage to second cousin Maria Barbara Bach (1684–1720); in second marriage 1721 to Anna Magdalena Wilcke (1701–1760)
Catharina Dorothea Bach (1708–1774)
Wilhelm Friedemann Bach (1710–1784) – the so-called "Dresden Bach" or "Halle Bach"
Carl Philipp Emanuel Bach (1714–1788) – the so-called "Hamburg Bach" or "Berlin Bach"
Johann Sebastian Bach (1748–1778) – painter
Johann Gottfried Bernhard Bach (1715–1739)
Gottfried Heinrich Bach (1724–1763)
Johann Christoph Friedrich Bach (1732–1795) – the so-called "Bückeburg Bach"
Wilhelm Friedrich Ernst Bach (1759–1845) – the so-called "Minden Bach"
Johann Christian Bach III (1735–1782) – the so-called "Milan Bach" or "London Bach"
Heinrich Bach I (1615–1692) – the so-called Arnstadt Line
Johann Christoph Bach I (1642–1703)
Johann Nikolaus Bach II (1669–1753)
Johann Christoph Bach V (1676–)
Johann Heinrich Bach II (1709–)
Johann Friedrich Bach I (1682–1730)
Johann Michael Bach II (1685–)
Johann Michael Bach I (1648–1694)
Maria Barbara Bach (1684–1720) – married Johann Sebastian Bach (1685–1750)
Johann Günther Bach I (1653–1683)
Philippus "Lips" Bach (1590–1620) – son of Veit Bach
Wendel Bach (1619–1682)
 (1655–1718)
Nicolaus Ephraim Bach (1690–1760)
Georg Michael Bach (1703–1771)
Johann Christian Bach IV (1743–1814)
Johann Ludwig Bach (1677–1731) – the so-called "Meininger Bach", composer
Gottlieb Friedrich Bach (1714–1785) – court organist, court painter, Meinigen
Johann Philipp Bach (1752–1846) – musician, painter
Samuel Anton Bach (1713–1781)
Johann Bach IV (1621–1686) – nephew of Lips Bach
Johann Stephan Bach (1665–1717)
Caspar Bach I (1570–1640) (brother of Veit Bach?)
Caspar Bach II (1600–)
Heinrich "Blinder Jonas" Bach (−1635)
Johann(es) Bach II (1612–1632)
Melchior Bach (1603–1634)
Nicolaus Bach (1619–1637)

See also

 P. D. Q. Bach

References

Sources

External links

 Bach family tree
 Bach family, bach-cantatas.com

 
Family trees